Saturn A-1, studied in 1959, was projected to be the first version of Saturn I and was to be used if necessary before the S-IV liquid hydrogen second stage became available. The first stage, proposed for the Juno V rocket, but finally used for the first Saturn rocket, would propel the Saturn A-1 into space, with the first stage of a Titan I missile continuing the flight and finally, a Centaur C high-energy double-engine third stage could perform a small burn to send a payload into its final orbit, or it can perform a big burn to take a payload out of Earth orbit to other planets. This rocket never flew, but all stages of the Saturn A-1 were used on different launch vehicles. Today, they are all retired.

Saturn (rocket family)
Cancelled space launch vehicles